Cetomimoides parri is a species of flabby whalefish found in the Pacific Ocean in the vicinity of the Philippines.  This species grows to a length of  SL.

References
 

Cetomimidae
Monotypic fish genera
Fish described in 1955